is a railway station on the Keikyu Main Line in Ōta, Tokyo, Japan, operated by Keikyu.

Lines
Zōshiki Station is served by the Keikyū Main Line.

Layout
This elevated station consists of two side platforms serving two tracks.

History 
Keikyu introduced station numbering to its stations on 21 October 2010; Zōshiki Station was assigned station number KK18.

References 

Railway stations in Japan opened in 1901
Railway stations in Tokyo